Ogaden (pronounced and often spelled Ogadēn;) is one of the historical names given to the modern Somali Region, the territory comprising the eastern portion of Ethiopia formerly part of the Hararghe province. The other two names are the Haud and Reserved area.

Etymology
The origin of the term Ogaden is unknown, however it is usually attributed to the Somali clan of the same name, originally referring only to their land, and eventually expanding to encompass most parts of the modern Somali Region of Ethiopia. 

During the new region's founding conference, which was held in Dire Dawa in 1992, the naming of the region became a divisive issue, because almost 30 Somali clans live in the Somali Region of Ethiopia. The ONLF sought to name the region ‘Ogadenia’, whilst the non-Ogadeni Somali clans who live in the same region opposed this move. As noted by Abdul Majid Hussein, the naming of the region where there are several Somali clans as ‘Ogadenia’ following the name of a single clan would have been divisive. Finally, the region was named the Somali region. 

An alternative (possibly folk) etymology analyses the name as a combination of the Harari word ūga ("road") and Aden, a city in Yemen, supposedly deriving from an ancient caravan route through the region connecting Harar to the Arabian Peninsula.

History
There are few historical texts written about the people who lived in what is known today as the Somali Region, sometimes referred to as The 'Ogaden' region of Ethiopia. In its early history, The 'Ogaden' was inhabited by Harla, a now extinct people. Harla are linked to the Harari and Somali Ogaden clan. In the ninth century Ogaden served as capital of the Makhzumi Dynasty. Ogaden was part of the Ifat Sultanate in the 13th and beginning of the 14th centuries AD. The borders of the sultanate extended to the Shewa–Addis Ababa area of Ethiopia. The Ifat Sultanate was succeeded by the Adal Sultanate. There was an ongoing conflict between the Adal Sultanate and the Christian Kingdom of Abyssinia throughout this time. During the first half of the 16th century, most of Abyssinian territory was conquered and came under the rule of Adal, when Ahmad ibn Ibrahim al-Ghazi, the leader of Adal, took control.

In the seventeenth century it became a tributary state of the Emirate of Harar. During the last quarter of the 19th century, the region was conquered by Menelik II of Ethiopia, who solidified their claim by treaties in 1897.

I.M. Lewis argues a subtly different interpretation of this treaty, emphasising that "the lost lands in the Haud which were excised from the Protectorate [i.e. British Somaliland] were not, however ceded to Ethiopia". In practice, Ethiopia exerted little administrative control east of Jijiga until 1934 when an Anglo-Ethiopian boundary commission attempted to demarcate the treaty boundary. This boundary is still disputed.

In 1914, Lij Iyasu of Ethiopia appointed Abdullahi Sadiq, governor of Ogaden.

After the Italian conquest of Ethiopia in 1936, Ogaden was attached to Italian Somaliland, becoming the Somalia Governorate within the new colony of Italian East Africa. Following the British conquest of this colony, the Anglo-Ethiopian Agreement placed Ogaden under temporary British control. The British sought to unite Ogaden with British Somaliland and the former Italian Somaliland to realize Greater Somalia which was supported by many Somalis. Ethiopia unsuccessfully pleaded before the London Conference of the Allied Powers to gain the Ogaden and Eritrea in 1945, but their persistent negotiations and pressure from the United States eventually persuaded the British to cede Ogaden to Ethiopia in 1948. The last remaining British controlled parts of Haud were returned to Ethiopia in 1955.

In the late 1970s, internal unrest in the 'Ogaden' resumed. The Western Somali Liberation Front, spurred by Makhtal Dahir, used guerilla tactics to resist Ethiopian rule. Ethiopia and Somalia fought the Ogaden War over control of this region and its peoples.

During the new region's founding conference, which was held in Dire Dawa in 1992, the naming of the region became a divisive issue, because almost 30 Somali clans live in the Somali Region of Ethiopia. The ONLF sought to name the region ‘Ogadenia’, whilst the non-Ogadeni Somali clans who live in the same region opposed this move. As noted by Abdul Majid Hussein, the naming of the region where there are several Somali clans as ‘Ogadenia’ following the name of a single clan would have been divisive. Finally, the region was named the Somali region.

In 2007, the Ethiopian Army launched a military crackdown in Ogaden after Ogaden rebels killed dozens of civilian staff workers and guards at an Ethiopian oil field. The main rebel group is the Ogaden National Liberation Front under its Chairman Mohamed O. Osman, which is fighting against the Ethiopian government. Some Somalis who inhabit in the 'Ogaden' claimed that Ethiopian military kill civilians, destroy the livelihood of many of the ethnic Somalis and commit crimes against the nomads in the region. However, testimony before the United States House of Representatives Committee on Foreign Affairs revealed massive brutality and killings by the ONLF rebels, which the Ethiopian government labels "terrorists." The extent of this war can't be established due to a media blockade in the 'Ogaden' region. Some international rights organizations have accused the Ethiopian government of committing abuses and crimes that "violate laws of war," as a recent report by the Human Rights Watch indicates. Other reports have claimed that Ethiopia has bombed, killed, and raped many Somalis in the Ogaden region, while the United States continues to arm Ethiopia in the United States' ongoing War on Terror in the Horn of Africa.

Geography
The region, which is around 200,000 square kilometres, borders Djibouti, Kenya, Somalia, and Somaliland. Important towns include Jijiga, Degahbur, Gode, Kebri Dahar, Fiq, Shilabo, Kelafo, Werder and Danan.

Ecology
The Ogaden is part of the Somali Acacia–Commiphora bushlands and thickets ecoregion. It has been a historic habitat for the endangered African wild dog, Lycaon pictus; However, this canid is thought by some to have been extirpated from Ogaden.

The Ogaden is a plateau, with an elevation above sea level that ranges from 1,500 metres in the northwest, falling to about 300 metres along the southern limits and the Wabi Shebelle valley. The areas with altitudes between 1,400 and 1,600 metres are characterised as semi-arid; receiving as much as 500–600 mm of rainfall annually. More typical of the Ogaden is an average annual rainfall of 350 mm and less. The landscape consists of dense shrubland, bush grassland and bare hills. In more recent years, the Ogaden has suffered from increasingly erratic rainfall patterns, which has led to an increasing frequency of major droughts: in 1984–85; 1994; and most recently in 1999–2000, during which pastoralists claim to have lost 70–90 percent of their cattle.

People
The inhabitants are predominantly ethnic Somalis, of almost 30 clans. The Ogaden (clan) of the Darod constitute one of the majority in the region, and were enlisted in the Ogaden National Liberation Movement, That is why the region is associated with the Ogaden Clan. However, this is disputed. Other Somali clans in the region are Isaaq, Garre, Gadabuursi, Issa, Massare, Gabooye, Degodia and Jidle and Karanle Hawiye clans.

See also
 Ogaden Basin
 Insurgency in Ogaden
 Ogaden (clan)
 Ogaden War

Notes

External links

 CakaaraNews
 Somali State.com
 The Standard
 Ogaden Online
 Ogaden National Liberation Front
 Rasaasa News

 
Geography of Somalia
Geography of Ethiopia
Somali Acacia-Commiphora bushlands and thickets
Somali Region
Territorial disputes of Somalia
Members of the Unrepresented Nations and Peoples Organization